Bobby Vinton Sings for Lonely Nights is Bobby Vinton's eleventh studio album, released in 1965. This album was released to capitalize on the success of Vinton's big hit "Mr. Lonely" and his album of the same name by containing only songs that refer to loneliness. There were two singles from this album: "Long Lonely Nights" (previously a minor hit for Lee Andrews & the Hearts then for Clyde McPhatter in 1957 and then for The Four Seasons in 1964) and Vinton's self-penned "L-O-N-E-L-Y". Cover versions include "Saturday Night (Is the Loneliest Night of the Week)", "All Alone Am I", "Oh, How I Miss You Tonight", "In the Still of the Night", "I'll Walk Alone" and "Have You Ever Been Lonely (Have You Ever Been Blue?)".

Track listing

Personnel
Bob Morgan – producer
Cardell – cover photo

Charts
Album – Billboard (North America)

Singles – Billboard (North America)

1965 albums
Bobby Vinton albums
Epic Records albums